Bruce by-election may refer to several by-elections in the history of the  electorate in New Zealand:

 1862 Bruce by-election
 April 1865 Bruce by-election
 July 1865 Bruce by-election
 1870 Bruce by-election
 1883 Bruce by-election
 1885 Bruce by-election
 1892 Bruce by-election
 1920 Bruce by-election

There has also been one by-election in the Division of Bruce in Victoria, Australia:
 1983 Bruce by-election